In the Universal Mobile Telecommunications System (UMTS) and 3GPP Long Term Evolution (LTE), user equipment (UE) is any device used directly by an end-user to communicate. It can be a hand-held telephone, a laptop computer equipped with a mobile broadband adapter, or any other device. It connects to the base station Node B/eNodeB as specified in the ETSI 125/136-series and 3GPP 25/36-series of specifications.  It roughly corresponds to the mobile station (MS) in GSM systems.

The radio interface between the UE and the Node B is called Uu.

Functionality 
UE handles the following tasks towards the core network:
 Mobility management
 Call control
 Session management
 Identity management

The corresponding protocols are transmitted transparently via a Node B, that is, Node B does not change, use or understand the information. These protocols are also referred to as Non Access Stratum protocols.

The UE is a device which initiates all the calls and it is the terminal device in a network.

References

External links 

 3GPP 25-series of specifications
 3GPP 36-series of specifications

 
UMTS
Mobile telecommunications standards
3GPP standards